Crioa hades is a species of moth of the family Erebidae first described by Oswald Bertram Lower in 1903. It is found in Australia.

References

Calpinae